Florent-en-Argonne (literally Florent in Argonne) is a commune in the longitudinal valley of the Biesme, in the Marne department of north-eastern France.

See also
Communes of the Marne department
Forest of Argonne

References

Florentenargonne